Francis Pictet (born 4 June 1866, date of death unknown) was an Australian cricketer. He played one first-class match for Tasmania in 1897.

See also
 List of Tasmanian representative cricketers

References

External links
 

1866 births
Year of death missing
Australian cricketers
Tasmania cricketers
Sportspeople from Bath, Somerset